Isidore II Xanthopoulos, (? – 31 March 1462) was Ecumenical Patriarch of Constantinople from 1456 to 1462.

Life
Little is known about the life and the patriarchate of Isidore except that he was an ethnic Greek and member of Greek community in Istanbul. His surname derives from the Xanthopoulon monastery in Istanbul which he entered, becoming a hieromonk and later rising to be its abbot. Isidore worked alongside Gennadius Scholarius during the Council of Florence and was one of the signatories of a 1445 document against the East-West Union of Churches. In this period, Isidore was deemed the spiritual father of the Greek community in Istanbul. Immediately prior to his election, he was serving as the Metropolitan bishop of Heraclea.

After the resignation of Gennadius Scholarius as Patriarch in mid-January 1456, Isidore was elected to succeed him. He obtained the confirmation from Sultan Mehmed II, and he was consecrated bishop in the Pammakaristos Church.

His reign lasted up to his death on 31 March 1462, and he was succeeded by Joasaph I.

Notes

Sources

 
 
  

1462 deaths
15th-century patriarchs of Constantinople
Year of birth unknown